The County of Namur was not often an independent state, rather under the dominion of other entities like the counties of Hainaut and Flanders or the Duchy of Burgundy.

Succession is from father to son, unless otherwise noted.

Counts

House of Namur

 Robert I (r. 946 – 981)
 Albert I (r. 992 – 1010)
 Robert II (r. 1010 – 1018?)
 Albert II (r. 1018? – 1067)
 Albert III (r. 1067 – 1102)
 Godfrey I (r. 1102 – 1139)
 Henry I the Blind (r. 1139 – 1189) 
 Alice, sister of, married Baldwin IV, Count of Hainaut

Marquises

House of Flanders

 Baldwin I (r. 1189 – 1195), nephew of
 Philip I (r. 1195 – 1212) 
 Yolanda (r.1212 – 1217), sister of, also Empress of the Latin Empire as Yolanda I, married Peter II of Courtenay

House of Courtenay

 Philip II (r. 1217 – 1226) 
 Henry II (r. 1226 – 1229), brother of
 Margaret (r. 1229 – 1237), sister of
 Baldwin II (r. 1237 – 1256), brother of, also Emperor of the Latin Empire as Baldwin II

House of Luxembourg

 Henry III (r. 1256 – 1265), grand son of Henry I the Blind. By force.

House of Dampierre

 Guy I (r. 1265 – 1297). Bought the county from his cousin Baldwin II and chased Henry III.  
 John I (r. 1297 – 1330)
 John II (r. 1330 – 1335)
 Guy II (r. 1335 – 1336), brother of
 Philip III (r. 1336 – 1337), brother of
 William I (r. 1337 – 1391), brother of
 William II (r. 1391 – 1418)
 John III (r. 1418 – 1421; died 1429), brother of

In 1421, John III sells his estates to Philip the Good, Duke of Burgundy.

House of Valois-Burgundy

 1405-1419 : John IV the Fearless
 1419-1467 - Philip IV the Good
 1467-1477 : Charles I the Bold
 1477-1482 : Mary I the Rich, daughter of, married

House of Habsburg

 1493-1519 : Maximilian, husband of, also Emperor of the Holy Roman Empire as Maximilian I 
 1519-1556 : Charles II, grandson, also Emperor of the Holy Roman Empire as Charles V

Charles V proclaimed the Pragmatic Sanction of 1549 eternally uniting Namur with the other lordships of the Low Countries in a personal union.  When the Habsburg empire was divided among the heirs of Charles V, the Low Countries, including Namur, went to Philip II of Spain, of the Spanish branch of the House of Habsburg.

 1556-1598 : Philip V, also King of Spain as Philip II
 1598-1621 : Isabella Clara Eugenia, daughter of, married Albert, Archduke of Austria)
 1621-1665 : Philip VI, half brother of, also King of Spain as Philip IV
 1665-1700 : Charles III, also King of Spain as Charles II

Between 1706 and 1714 Namur was invaded by the English and the Dutch during the War of the Spanish Succession.  The fief was claimed by the House of Habsburg and the House of Bourbon.  In 1712 Luxembourg and Namur were ceded to Maximilian II Emanuel, Elector of Bavaria by his French allies, but with the end of the war in 1713 with the Treaty of Utrecht Max. Emanuel was restored as Elector of Bavaria.  The Treaty of Utrecht also settled the succession, and the Margraviate of Namur went to the Austrian branch of the House of Habsburg, along with the rest of the Spanish Netherlands.

 1714-1740 : Charles IV, great grandson of Philip III 
 1740-1780 : Mary II Theresa, daughter of, married Francis I
 1780-1790 : Joseph I, also Emperor of the Holy Roman Empire as Joseph II

The title was factually abolished in the aftermath of the French revolution and the annexation of Namur by France in 1795.  Although, the title remained officially claimed by the descendants of Leopold II until the reign of Karl I of Austria.

 1790-1792 : Leopold, brother of, also Emperor of the Holy Roman Empire as Leopold II
 1792-1835 : Francis II, also Emperor of the Holy Roman Empire as Francis II
 1835-1848 : Ferdinand, also Emperor of Austria as Ferdinand I 
 1848-1916 : Francis III Joseph, grandson of Francis II, also Emperor of Austria as Francis Joseph I

Namur
Namur
Namur
History of Wallonia